Rubén Alejandro Ramírez dos Ramos (born 18 October 1995) is a Venezuelan professional footballer who plays as a defender for Monagas.

Professional career
Ramírez spent most of his early career playing in various Venezuelan teams, before joining Fortuna Sittard on loan in 2018. He made his professional debut with Fortuna Sittard in a 3–0 Eredivisie win over PEC Zwolle on 4 November 2018.

On 28 August 2019, Ramírez signed for Urartu.

International career
Ramírez was born in Venezuela and is of Portuguese descent. He represented the Venezuela U21s at the 2014 CAC Games, and the Venezuela U20s at the 2015 South American U-20 Championship.

Honours
Caracas
 Copa Venezuela (1): 2013

References

External links
 Soccerway Profile
 Fortuna Sittard Profile

Living people
1995 births
Footballers from Caracas
Venezuelan footballers
Venezuela under-20 international footballers
Venezuelan people of Portuguese descent
Fortuna Sittard players
Atlético Venezuela C.F. players
Eredivisie players
Carabobo F.C. players
Caracas FC players
Association football defenders
Venezuelan expatriate footballers
Venezuelan expatriate sportspeople in the Netherlands
Expatriate footballers in the Netherlands